is an important case in unjust enrichment in the Privy Council.

Facts

Dextra drew a cheque for $2,999,000 from its bankers to lend to the Bank of Jamaica. Its agents told Dextra the money was for a loan. The Bank of Jamaica was told the money was for foreign currency purchased by its agents. They gave the money to the agents, but the agents were fraudsters. Dextra wanted restitution.

Judgment
The Privy Council held that the claim failed, first because Dextra had made no relevant mistake of fact, and second because the Bank of Jamaica had changed its position. On the question of the change of position defence, Dextra argued that the Bank of Jamaica were relatively at fault, and therefore their defence should fail. Lord Bingham and Lord Goff said in the course of their advice,

Comment
The decision in Dextra has been broadly accepted by academic lawyers, although it has been pointed out that the difference between a "misprediction" and a "mistake of fact" is a very narrow one.  In  the court held that where the claimant paid drachmas into an account under the mistaken belief that the drachmas would be converted into US dollars, that was a mistake of fact which could found a restitutionary claim.

See also

English unjust enrichment law

Footnotes

English unjust enrichment case law
Judicial Committee of the Privy Council cases on appeal from Jamaica
2001 in case law
2001 in Jamaica